Elizabeth McCarthy may refer to:

Liz McCarthy (fighter) (born 1986), American mixed martial artist
Elizabeth McCarthy, see 1991 New Year Honours
Betty McCarthy, a character in the film To Find a Man

See also
Beth McCarthy (disambiguation)